Gombe, Butambala, often referred to simply as Gombe, is a municipality in Butambala District in the Central Region of Uganda. It is the main municipal, administrative, and commercial center of the district and the site of the district headquarters.

Location
The coordinates of Gombe, Butambala are 0°10'52.0"N, 32°06'51.0"E (Latitude:0.181111; Longitude:32.114167).

Population
In August 2014, the national population census put Gombe's population at 15,196.

Points of interest
The following additional points of interest lie within or near the town:

 headquarters of Gombe Town Council
 Gombe central market
 Gombe Secondary School
 Gombe General Hospital, a 100-bed public hospital administered by the Uganda Ministry of Health
 Mpigi–Kabulasoke–Maddu–Sembabule Road, passing through the middle of town

See also
Gombe, Wakiso
Hospitals in Uganda
List of cities and towns in Uganda

References

Butambala District
Populated places in Central Region, Uganda
Cities in the Great Rift Valley